Chibly Abouhamad Hobaica (1929–2005) was a lawyer, teacher and writer in Venezuela.

Career 
He was a professor at the Universidad Católica Andrés Bello and Universidad Central de Venezuela. His works and thoughts are a mainstay for the study of law in Venezuela. He was also the winner of the Academy of Political and Social Sciences awards in 1977 for his "New Approach to Family Law."

Chibly Abouhamad Hobaica died on November 23, 2005.

References 

1929 births
2005 deaths
20th-century Venezuelan lawyers